North-Eastern District was an electoral district for the Legislative Council of South Australia from 1882 until 1912. It was then renamed to Midland District and continued until 1975 when the separate districts were abolished and the state elects members to the Legislative Council as a single district since that time.

At its creation, the North-Eastern District elected six of the 24 members of the Legislative Council. Following the 1902 reduction in the size of the parliament, it elected 4 of 18 (20 after 1915) members. Its initial extent was the House of Assembly districts of Yatala, Gumeracha, Barossa, Wooroora, Light and Burra.

The Midland district included the Assembly districts of Barossa, Wooroora and Wallaroo thus including Yorke Peninsula (which had been in the Northern District) but giving up the Burra area.

Members

The members who represented the North-Eastern and Midlands districts were:

From the 1902 double dissolution election, each district only elected 4 members, for two terms of the lower house. Legislative Council elections are held at the same time as House of Assembly elections.

References

Former electoral districts of South Australia